The 2021 Tour Cycliste Féminin International de l'Ardèche was the 19th edition of the Tour Cycliste Féminin International de l'Ardèche road cycling stage race, which was held from 8 to 14 September 2021 in southeastern France. The race was categorised as a 2.1 event.

Teams 
Five of the nine UCI Women's WorldTeams, 14 UCI Women's Continental Teams, and one Elite Domestic team made up the 20 teams that participated in the race. Ten teams entered a full squad of six riders, while eight teams entered only five riders. Furthermore, two teams,  and  entered only four riders. Of the 108 riders to start the race, 79 finished.

UCI Women's WorldTeams

 
 
 
 
 

UCI Women's Continental Teams

 
 
 
 
 
 
 
 
 
 
 
 
 
 

 Elite Domestic Teams

 MAT ATOM Deweloper Wrocław

Route

Stages

Stage 1 
8 September 2021 — Aubenas to Barjac,

Stage 2 
9 September 2021 — Anneyron to Beauchastel,

Stage 3 
10 September 2021 — Avignon to Avignon,

Stage 4 
11 September 2021 — Aumont-Aubrac to Mont Lozère,

Stage 5 
12 September 2021 — Saint-Jean-en-Royans to Saint-Jean-en-Royans,

Stage 6 
13 September 2021 — Anduze to Goudargues,

Stage 7 
14 September 2021 — Le Pouzin to Privas,

Classification leadership table 

 On stage 2, Marta Bastianelli, who was second in the sprints classification, wore the green jersey, because first-placed Arlenis Sierra wore the pink jersey as the leader of the general classification. Bastianelli wore the green jersey again on stages 6 and 7, but with Leah Thomas as the leader of the general classification.
 On stage 2, Nicole Steigenga, who was second in the rushes classification, wore the violet jersey, because first-placed Katia Ragusa wore the polka-dot jersey as the leader of the mountains classification. For the same reason, Marissa Baks, who was second in the combination classification, wore the blue jersey.
 On stage 4, Lizzie Deignan, who was second in the combination classification, wore the blue jersey, because first-placed Pauliena Rooijakkers wore the polka-dot jersey as the leader of the mountains classification. For the same reason, Thalita de Jong wore the blue jersey on stage 5, Ruth Winder on stage 6, and Emma Langley on stage 7.

Final classification standings

General classification

Sprints classification

Mountains classification

Rushes classification

Combination classification

Young rider classification

Team classification

References

Sources

External links 
  

2021 in women's road cycling
September 2021 sports events in France